Secondary Highway 518, commonly referred to as Highway 518, is a provincially maintained secondary highway in the Canadian province of Ontario. Highway 518 spans  between Parry Sound and Kearney. It serves as one of the many links between Highway 400 and Highway 11. The highway was assumed in 1956, and has remained generally unchanged since, aside from being truncated slightly at both ends.

Route description 
Highway 518 generally parallels the Seguin Trail, a recreational trail along the old rail bed of the Ottawa, Arnprior and Parry Sound Railway.
It begins at Exit 220 of Highway 400, south of the town of Parry Sound, where the road continues west as Hunter Drive to the former route of Highway 69 (Oastler Park Drive). From Highway 400, the route travels straight east to Orrville, where it turns north onto Star Lake Road. The route zig-zags through rugged Canadian Shield and thick forests, generally arching northeast until meeting the Nipissing Colonization Road north of the ghost town of Seguin Falls. The highway crosses the Seguin Trail, turns east and parallels it through Bear Lake, Whitehall and Sprucedale. The trail arcs south at this point, and Highway 518 continues east. South of Doe Lake, the highway turns northeast, while Star Lake Road continues east.

The highway interchanges with Highway 11 at Exit 248, then immediately turns south and parallels Highway 11 until it meets Star Lake Road, which it turns east and follows through Emsdale. Within that town, it intersects Highway 592, the original route of Highway 11 before the freeway bypass opened. Highway 518 continues east through forests, ending at the entrance to Kearney. However, signage has not been removed east of this point.

History 
Highway 518 was first assumed by the Department of Highways in early 1956, along with several dozen other secondary highways, but was likely maintained as a development road prior to that;
Its route remained unchanged between then and January 1, 1998, when the easternmost  were decommissioned, returning the eastern terminus to the boundary into Kearney.
The westernmost section of 518, between Highway 400 and Oastler Park Drive, has also since been decommissioned by the extension of Highway 400, and is now known as Hunter Drive.

Major intersections

References 

518
Roads in Parry Sound District